Forest City is an unincorporated community in Forest City Township, Meeker County, Minnesota, United States, near Litchfield and Watkins.  The community is located along Meeker County Road 2 near its junction with State Highway 24 (MN 24).  The North Fork of the Crow River flows nearby.

History
Forest City was platted in 1857, and named for its location near the Big Woods. A post office was established at Forest City in 1856, and remained in operation until 1907.

References

Terry Tales by Terry R. Shaw

Former municipalities in Minnesota
Unincorporated communities in Minnesota
Unincorporated communities in Meeker County, Minnesota
1857 establishments in Minnesota Territory
Populated places established in 1857